Léon Konan Koffi (16 November 1928 – 29 August 2017) was an Ivorian politician. He served as the Interior Minister of the Ivory Coast under President Félix Houphouët-Boigny. He was a commander of the National Order of Merit and the Legion of Honour.

References

1928 births
2017 deaths
Government ministers of Ivory Coast
Commanders of the Ordre national du Mérite
Commandeurs of the Légion d'honneur
People from Lagunes District